Stomothrips is a genus of thrips in the family Phlaeothripidae.

Species
 Stomothrips cycasi
 Stomothrips mouldeni

References

Phlaeothripidae
Thrips
Thrips genera